The lacrimal papilla is the small rise in the bottom (inferior) and top (superior) eyelid just before it ends at the corner of the eye closest to the nose. At the medial edge of it is the lacrimal punctum, a small hole that lets tears drain into the inside of the nose through the lacrimal canaliculi. 

In medical terms, the lacrimal papilla is a small conical elevation on the margin of each eyelid at the basal angles of the lacrimal lake. Its apex is pierced by a small orifice, the lacrimal punctum, the commencement of the lacrimal canaliculi.

It is otherwise known commonly as simply the 'tear duct'.

See also
 Papilla (disambiguation)

References

External links
 Description at uams.edu

Human eye anatomy